CILU-FM is a Canadian radio station, which broadcasts at 102.7 FM in Thunder Bay, Ontario. It is the campus radio station of the city's Lakehead University.

The station was licensed by the Canadian Radio-television and Telecommunications Commission in 2004 and officially launched in early 2005.

References

External links
 LU Radio
 
 

Ilu
Ilu
Lakehead University
Radio stations established in 2005
2005 establishments in Ontario